Golu Ke Goggles is a Hindi language Indian television series that aired on STAR Plus from 2006 to 2007. The series starring Karan Attri as Golu, was produced by Bikramjith Singh Bhullar and Grusha Kapoor.

Plot
The series is about a simple and innocent 12-year-old boy from a hill station named Golu. He is also of very shy nature, which causes him to not bond with unfamiliar people. The shyness and simplicity of Golu sets him apart from all other individuals and it also helps him to move on in his life with a certain "good force". At one point, his life takes a drastic turn when he lands upon a pair of goggles. This pair of glasses acts as his weapon that slowly turns him into a wiser, more responsible individual who gradually learns how to deal with life.

Cast

Karan Attri as Golu
Vaishnavi Rao as Renee
Harsh Paresh Somaiya as Aakash
Abhishek Shah as Rohan
Krishna Magaraiya as Yogi
Krishan Savjani as Amit
Khushali Bhansali as Ira

Guest appearance
Ayush Sharma as Ayush(Golu’s saviour)

References

Indian television series
Indian children's television series
Indian television soap operas
2006 Indian television series debuts
2007 Indian television series endings